This is a list of qualifying teams in the 2022 NCAA Division I women's basketball tournament.  A total of 68 teams entered the tournament. 32 of the teams earned automatic bids by winning their conference tournaments, while remaining 36 teams were granted "at-large" bids, which are extended by the NCAA Selection Committee. All teams are seeded 1 to 16 within their regionals, while the selection committee seeded the entire field from 1 to 68.

Automatic bids 
A total of 32 automatic bids to the tournament are granted to the below listed conferences, normally to the team that wins the conference's championship tournament. Seeds listed reflect seeding within the conference tournaments. Runners-up in boldface later received at-large berths.

At-large bids

36 at-large teams were determined through the NCAA basketball tournament selection process.

Tournament seeds (list by region and grouping)

*See First Four

Conferences with multiple bids

Bids by state  

<noinclude>

See also 
2022 NCAA Division I men's basketball tournament qualifying teams

References

NCAA Division I Women's Basketball Tournament qualifying teams
qualifying teams